Aber Bergen is a Norwegian television series first broadcast on 22 September 2016 on TV3.

Ellen Dorrit Petersen was awarded the prize for best actress at the 2017 Gullruten ("Golden Screen") awards, while the series was nominated in the categories Best TV Drama and Best Audio/Scene/Production Design (Carly Reddin). It was nominated for four awards in the Gullruten 2018: Best Drama Series, Best Actress (Ellen Dorrit Petersen), Best Actor (Odd-Magnus Williamson), and Best Photography in TV Drama (Tore Vollan).

Synopsis
The series follows the newly divorced Erik Aber and Elea Bergen, partners in the law firm Aber Bergen. The two defense lawyers engage in numerous challenging court cases as they attempt to balance their professional and private lives.

Cast and characters
 Ellen Dorrit Petersen as Elea Bergen Vessel
 Odd-Magnus Williamson as Erik Aber
 Line Verndal as Diana Drange
 Lykke Kristine Moen as Unn Frøynes
 Siv Torin Knudsen Petersen as Trine-Lise
 Torgny Gerhard Aanderaa as Magnus Braseth

References

External links
 

Norwegian drama television series
2010s legal television series
TV3 (Norway) original programming